Osman Pasha (also spelled Uthman Pasha or Othman Pasha) may refer to:
 Özdemiroğlu Osman Pasha (1527–1585), Ottoman grand vizier
 Bosniak Osman Pasha (died 1685), Ottoman governor of Egypt, Damascus, and Bosnia
 Topal Osman Pasha (1663–1733), Ottoman grand vizier
 Muhassıl Osman Pasha (died 1750), Ottoman governor of Egypt, Damascus, Tripoli, Sidon, and Jeddah
 Uthman Pasha al-Kurji, Ottoman governor of Damascus (1760–1771) and Tripoli
 Osman Pasha (naval officer) (1792–1860), Ottoman naval officer

See also 
 Osman Nuri Pasha (disambiguation)
 Osman (name)